Chittagong Export Processing Zone (CEPZ), also known as Chittagong EPZ, is the first and one of the eight export processing zones in Bangladesh located at South Halishahar in Chittagong.  It was established in 1983. In 2010, CEPZ was ranked third in the best cost-competitiveness category and fourth as the best economic potential in the global ranking in a survey among the world's 700 economic zones carried out by FDi magazine.

Gallery

See also
 Bangladesh Export Processing Zone Authority
 Uttara Export Processing Zone

References

External links

Economy of Chittagong
Foreign trade of Bangladesh
Chittagong